Swynnerton's robin (Swynnertonia swynnertoni) is a species of bird in the family Muscicapidae. It is monotypic within the genus Swynnertonia. The common and Latin names commemorate the entomologist Charles Swynnerton.

Range and habitat
It is found in Tanzania, Mozambique, and Zimbabwe. Its natural habitats are subtropical or tropical moist lowland forests and subtropical or tropical moist montane forests. It is threatened by habitat loss.

In Zimbabwe this species is found in relict montane forests in the Eastern Highlands. It is protected in the Bunga and Chirinda Forest Botanical Reserves (also possibly in the Chimanimani and Nyanga National Parks). Within the forests it occurs at high population densities and almost always nests in the small indigenous Dracaena plants.

Description
It is superficially similar to the larger White-starred robin, but has a white crescent on the upper breast, which is bordered below with a black line, and its grey tail lacks yellow windows. Its sexually dimorphic plumage is unusual among African robins. The female has duller plumage and an olive wash over the crown and face. Juveniles are spotted buffy yellow on the head and upper parts, while the chest crescent is pale greyish brown.

References

External links
 Swynnerton's robin - Species text in The Atlas of Southern African Birds.

Swynnerton's robin
Birds of Southern Africa
Swynnerton's robin
Taxonomy articles created by Polbot